Lukas Wallner (born 26 April 2003) is an Austrian professional footballer who plays as a centre-back for 2. Liga club Liefering.

Club career
Wallner started his football career with hometown club TSV St. Johann. In 2013, he moved to the academy of Liefering the reserve team of Red Bull Salzburg. He was promoted to the academy of the main team in 2015.

Ahead of the 2020–21 season, Wallner was included in the Liefering first-team squad competing in the second-tier 2. Liga. He made his professional on 7 March 2021, when he came on as a substitute for Bryan Okoh in the 84th minute of a 6–2 victory against SV Horn. He scored his first goal for the club 2 April, opening the score in a 2–1 win over Grazer AK.

On 20 December 2021, Wallner signed a contract until 2025 with Red Bull Salzburg, as he continued gaining experience at the second level with Liefering.

International career
Wallner would gain his first cap for an Austrian national youth team in October 2017, appearing for the under-15s. In September 2019, he made his debut for Austria U17 against England. 

In September 2021, he made his debut in the under-19 team against Turkey. With the under-19s, he took part in the 2022 UEFA European Under-19 Championship. During the tournament he appeared in all four games, which saw Austria eliminated in the group stage.

Career statistics

References

2003 births
Living people
Austrian footballers
Austria youth international footballers
Association football defenders
2. Liga (Austria) players
TSV St. Johann im Pongau players
FC Liefering players
FC Red Bull Salzburg players
People from St. Johann im Pongau District
Footballers from Salzburg (state)